Robert Selden Duvall (born January 5, 1931) is an American actor and filmmaker. His career spans more than seven decades and he is considered one of the greatest American actors of all time. He is the recipient of an Academy Award, four Golden Globe Awards, a BAFTA Award, two Primetime Emmy Awards and a Screen Actors Guild Award. Duvall started his career on stage before transitioning to film and television. 

Duvall made his Broadway debut in the play Wait Until Dark in 1966. He returned to the stage in David Mamet's play American Buffalo in 1977 earning a Drama Desk Award for Outstanding Actor in a Play nomination. 
He made his feature film acting debut portraying Boo Radley in To Kill a Mockingbird (1962). Other early roles include in Captain Newman, M.D. (1963), Bullitt (1968), True Grit (1969), M*A*S*H (1970), THX 1138 (1971), Joe Kidd (1972), and Tomorrow (1972), the later of which was developed at The Actors Studio and is his personal favorite. 

Duvall won the Academy Award for Best Actor for his role in the film Tender Mercies (1983). His other Oscar-nominated films include The Godfather (1972), Apocalypse Now (1979), The Great Santini (1979), The Apostle (1997), A Civil Action (1998), and The Judge (2014). Other notable roles include in The Outfit (1973), The Godfather Part II (1974), The Conversation (1974), Network (1976), True Confessions (1981), The Natural (1984), Days of Thunder (1990), The Handmaid's Tale (1990), Rambling Rose (1991),  Falling Down (1993), The Paper (1994),  The Scarlet Letter (1995), The Apostle (1997), Open Range (2003), Crazy Heart (2009), Get Low (2010), Jack Reacher (2012), and Widows (2018).

Throughout his career he has starred in numerous television programs. He won the Primetime Emmy Award for Outstanding Limited Series and Outstanding Lead Actor in a Limited Series for the AMC limited series Broken Trail (2007). His other Emmy-nominated roles were in the CBS miniseries Lonesome Dove (1989), the HBO film Stalin (1992), and the TNT film The Man Who Captured Eichmann (1996).

Early life 
Duvall was born January 5, 1931, in San Diego, California, to Mildred Virginia Duvall, an amateur actress, and Admiral William Howard Duvall, a Virginia-born United States Navy rear admiral. The second of three sons, he has an elder brother, William Jr. and a younger brother, John (1934–2000), who was an entertainment lawyer. His mother was a relative of American Civil War General Robert E. Lee, and a member of the Lee Family of Virginia, while his father was a descendant of settler Mareen Duvall. Duvall was raised in the Christian Science religion and has stated that, while it is his belief, he does not attend church. He grew up primarily in Annapolis, Maryland, site of the United States Naval Academy. He recalled: "I was a Navy brat. My father started at the Academy when he was 16, made captain at 39 and retired as a rear admiral." He attended Severn School in Severna Park, Maryland, and The Principia in St. Louis, Missouri. He graduated with a Bachelor of Arts degree in drama from Principia College in Elsah, Illinois, in 1953.

His father had expected him to attend the Naval Academy, but Duvall said "I was terrible at everything but acting—I could barely get through school". He again defied his father by serving in the United States Army after the Korean War (from August 19, 1953, to August 20, 1954) leaving the Army as private first class. "That's led to some confusion in the press," he explained in 1984, "Some stories have me shooting it out with the Commies from a foxhole over in Frozen Chosin. Pork Chop Hill stuff. Hell, I barely qualified with the M-1 rifle in basic training". While stationed at Camp Gordon (later renamed Fort Gordon) in Georgia, Duvall acted in an amateur production of the comedy Room Service in nearby Augusta, Georgia.

In the winter of 1955, Duvall attended the Neighborhood Playhouse School of the Theatre in New York City, under Sanford Meisner, on the G.I. Bill. During his two years there, Dustin Hoffman, Gene Hackman and James Caan were among his classmates. While studying acting, he worked as a Manhattan post office clerk. Duvall remains friends today with fellow California-born actors Hoffman and Hackman, whom he knew during their years as struggling actors. In 1955, Duvall roomed with Hoffman in a New York City apartment while they were studying together at the Playhouse. Around this time, he also roomed with Hackman, while working odd jobs such as clerking at Macy's, sorting mail at the post office, and driving a truck.

Career

Early career: 1952–1969

Theater
Duvall began his professional acting career with the Gateway Playhouse, an Equity summer theater based in Bellport, Long Island, New York. Arguably his stage debut was in its 1952 season when he played the Pilot in Laughter In The Stars, an adaptation of The Little Prince, at what was then the Gateway Theatre.

After a year's absence when he was with the U.S. Army (1953–1954), he returned to Gateway in its 1955 summer season, playing: Eddie Davis in Ronald Alexander's Time Out For Ginger (July 1955), Hal Carter in William Inge's Picnic (July 1955), Charles Wilder in John Willard's The Cat And The Canary (August 1955), Parris in Arthur Miller's The Crucible (August 1955), and John the Witchboy in William Berney and Howard Richardson's Dark of the Moon (September 1955). The playbill of Dark of the Moon indicated that he had portrayed the Witchboy before and that he will "repeat his famous portrayal" of this character for the 1955 season's revival of this play. For Gateway's 1956 season (his third season with the Gateway Players), he played the role of Max Halliday in Frederick Knott's Dial M for Murder (July 1956), Virgil Blessing in Inge's Bus Stop (August 1956), and Clive Mortimer in John van Druten's I Am a Camera (August 1956). The playbills for the 1956 season described him as "an audience favorite" in the last season and as having "appeared at the Neighborhood Playhouse in New York and studied acting with Sandy Meisner this past winter".

In its 1957 season, he appeared as Mr. Mayher in Agatha Christie's Witness For The Prosecution (July 1957), as Hector in Jean Anouilh's Thieves' Carnivall (July 1957), and the role which he once described as the "catalyst of his career": Eddie Carbone in Arthur Miller's A View from the Bridge (from July 30 to August 3, 1957, and directed by Ulu Grosbard, who was by then a regular director at the Gateway Theatre). Miller himself attended one of Duvall's performances as Eddie, and during that performance he met important people which allowed him, in two months, to land a "spectacular lead" in the Naked City television series.

While appearing at the Gateway Theatre in the second half of the 1950s, he was also appearing at the Augusta Civic Theatre, the McLean Theatre in Virginia and the Arena Stage in Washington, DC. The 1957 playbills also described him as "a graduate of the Neighborhood Playhouse" (indicating that he had completed his studies there by the summer of 1957), "a member of Sanford Meisner's professional workshop" and as having worked with Alvin Epstein, a mime and a member of Marcel Marceau's company. By this time (also July 1957), his theatrical credits included performances as Jimmy in The Rainmaker and as Harvey Weems in Horton Foote's The Midnight Caller. Already receiving top-billing at the Gateway Playhouse, in the 1959 season, he appeared in lead roles as Stanley Kowalski in Tennessee Williams' A Streetcar Named Desire (July–August 1959), Maxwell Archer in Once More with Feeling, Igor Romanoff in Peter Ustinov's Romanoff and Juliet, and Joe Mancuso in Kyle Crichton's The Happiest Millionaire (all in August 1959).

At the Neighborhood Playhouse, Meisner cast him in Tennessee Williams' Camino Real and the title role of Harvey Weems in Foote's one-act play The Midnight Caller. The latter was already part of Duvall's performance credits by mid-July 1957.

Duvall made his off-Broadway debut at the Gate Theater as Frank Gardner in George Bernard Shaw's Mrs. Warren's Profession on June 25, 1958. This play closed three days later (June 28) after five performances. His other early off-Broadway credits include the role of Doug in the premiere of Michael Shurtleff's Call Me By My Rightful Name on January 31, 1961, at One Sheridan Square and the role of Bob Smith in the premiere of William Snyder's The Days and Nights of BeeBee Fenstermaker on September 17, 1962, until June 9, 1963, at the Sheridan Square Playhouse. His most notable off-Broadway performance, for which he won an Obie Award in 1965 and which he considers his "Othello", was as Eddie Carbone (again) in Miller's A View From the Bridge at the Sheridan Square Playhouse from January 28, 1965, to December 11, 1966. It was directed again by Ulu Grosbard with Dustin Hoffman. On February 2, 1966, he made his Broadway debut as Harry Roat, Jr in Frederick Knott's Wait Until Dark at the Ethel Barrymore Theatre. This played at the Shubert Theatre and George Abbott Theatre and closed on December 31, 1966, at the Music Box Theatre. His other Broadway performance was as Walter Cole in David Mamet's American Buffalo, which opened at the Ethel Barrymore Theatre on February 16, 1977, and closed at the Belasco Theatre on June 11, 1977.

Television
In 1959, Duvall made his first television appearance on Armstrong Circle Theater in the episode "The Jailbreak". He appeared regularly on television as a guest actor during the 1960s, often in action, suspense, detective, or crime dramas. His appearances during this time include performances on Alfred Hitchcock Presents, Naked City, The Untouchables, Route 66, The Twilight Zone, Combat!, The Outer Limits, The Fugitive, T.H.E. Cat, Voyage to the Bottom of the Sea, The Time Tunnel, The F.B.I., and The Mod Squad.

Film
His film debut was as Boo Radley in the critically acclaimed To Kill a Mockingbird (1962). He was cast in the film on the recommendation of screenwriter Horton Foote, who met Duvall at Neighborhood Playhouse during a 1957 production of Foote's play, The Midnight Caller. Foote, who collaborated with Duvall many more times over the course of their careers, said he believed Duvall had a particular love of common people and ability to infuse fascinating revelations into his roles. Foote has described Duvall as "our number one actor."

After To Kill a Mockingbird, Duvall appeared in a number of films during the 1960s, mostly in midsized parts, but also in a few larger supporting roles. Some of his more notable appearances include the role of Capt. Paul Cabot Winston in Captain Newman, M.D. (1963), Chiz in Countdown (1968), and Gordon in The Rain People. Duvall had a small part as a cab driver who ferries McQueen around just before the chase scene in the film Bullitt (1968). He was the notorious malefactor "Lucky" Ned Pepper in True Grit (1969), in which he engaged in a climactic shootout with John Wayne's Rooster Cogburn on horseback.

Mid career: 1970–1989 

Duvall became an important presence in American films beginning in the 1970s. He drew a considerable amount of attention in 1970 for his portrayal of the malevolent Major Frank Burns in the film MASH and for his portrayal of the title role in THX 1138 in 1971 where he plays a fugitive trying to escape a society controlled by robots. His first major critical success came portraying Tom Hagen in The Godfather (1972) and The Godfather Part II (1974), the 1972 film earning him an Academy Award nomination for Best Supporting Actor. In 1976, Duvall played supporting roles in The Eagle Has Landed, and as Dr. Watson in The Seven-Per-Cent Solution with Nicol Williamson, Alan Arkin, Vanessa Redgrave and Laurence Olivier.

By the mid-1970s Duvall was a top character actor; People described him as "Hollywood's No. 1 No. 2 lead". Duvall received another Oscar nomination for Best Supporting Actor and won both a BAFTA Award and Golden Globe Award for his role as Lt. Colonel Kilgore in Apocalypse Now (1979). His line "I love the smell of napalm in the morning" from Apocalypse Now is regarded as iconic in cinema history. The full text is:

Duvall received a BAFTA Award nomination for his portrayal of detestable television executive Frank Hackett in the critically acclaimed film Network (1976) and garnered an Oscar nomination for Best Actor in a Leading Role in The Great Santini (1979) as the hard-boiled Marine Lt. Col. "Bull" Meechum. The latter role was based on a Marine aviator, Colonel Donald Conroy, the father of the book's author Pat Conroy. He also co-starred with Laurence Olivier and Tommy Lee Jones in The Betsy (1978) and portrayed United States President Dwight D. Eisenhower in the television miniseries Ike (1979).

Francis Ford Coppola praised Duvall as "one of the four or five best actors in the world". Wanting top billing in films, in 1977 Duvall returned to Broadway to appear as Walter Cole in David Mamet's American Buffalo, stating "I hope this will get me better film roles". He received a Drama Desk Award nomination for Outstanding Actor in a Play.

Duvall continued appearing in films during the 1980s, including the roles of disillusioned sportswriter Max Mercy in The Natural (1984) and Los Angeles police officer Bob Hodges in Colors (1988). He won an Oscar for Best Actor as country western singer Mac Sledge in Tender Mercies (1983). Duvall did his own singing, insisting it be added to his contract that he sing the songs himself; Duvall said, "What's the point if you're not going to do your own [singing]? They're just going to dub somebody else? I mean, there's no point to that."

Actress Tess Harper, who co-starred, said Duvall inhabited the character so fully that she only got to know Mac Sledge and not Duvall himself. Director Bruce Beresford, too, said the transformation was so believable to him that he could feel his skin crawling up the back of his neck the first day of filming with Duvall. Beresford said of the actor, "Duvall has the ability to completely inhabit the person he's acting. He totally and utterly becomes that person to a degree which is uncanny." Nevertheless, Duvall and Beresford did not get along well during the production and often clashed during filming, including one day in which Beresford walked off the set in frustration.

In 1989, Duvall appeared in the miniseries Lonesome Dove in the role of Captain Augustus "Gus" McCrae, Texas Rangers (retired). He has considered this particular role to be his personal favorite. He won a Golden Globe Award and earned an Emmy Award nomination. For his role as a former Texas Ranger peace officer, Duvall was trained in the use of Walker revolvers by the Texas marksman Joe Bowman.

Later career: 1990–present 

For The Godfather Part III (1990), Duvall declined the part, unless he was paid a salary comparable to Al Pacino's. In 2004, Duvall said on 60 Minutes, "if they paid Pacino twice what they paid me, that's fine, but not three or four times, which is what they did." In 1992, Duvall founded the production company Butcher's Run Films. Duvall has maintained a busy film career, sometimes appearing in as many as four in one year. He received Oscar nominations for his portrayals of evangelical preacher Euliss "Sonny" Dewey in The Apostle (1997)—a film he also wrote and directed—and played lawyer Jerome Facher in A Civil Action (1998).

He directed Assassination Tango (2002), a thriller about one of his favorite hobbies, tango. He portrayed General Robert E. Lee in Gods and Generals in 2003.

Other roles during this period that displayed the actor's wide range included that of a crew chief in Days of Thunder (1990), a retiring cop in Falling Down (1993), a Hispanic barber in Wrestling Ernest Hemingway (1993), a New York tabloid editor in The Paper (1994), a rural doctor in Phenomenon (1996), a father who owns a jumper horse farm in Something to Talk About  (1995), an abusive father in 1996's Sling Blade, an astronaut in Deep Impact (1998), a mechanic in Gone in 60 Seconds (2000), a soccer coach in A Shot at Glory, a scientist in The 6th Day (2000), a police officer in John Q. (2002), a trail boss in Open Range (2003), another soccer coach in the comedy Kicking & Screaming, an old free spirit in Secondhand Lions (2003), a Las Vegas poker champion in Lucky You, and a New York police chief in We Own the Night (both 2007).

He has his own star on the St. Louis Walk of Fame.

Duvall has periodically worked in television from the 1990s on. He won a Golden Globe Award and garnered an Emmy nomination for his portrayal of Soviet Premier Joseph Stalin in the 1992 television film Stalin. He was nominated for an Emmy again in 1997 for portraying Adolf Eichmann in The Man Who Captured Eichmann. In 2006, he won an Emmy for the role of Prentice "Print" Ritter in the revisionist Western miniseries Broken Trail.

In 2005, Duvall was awarded a National Medal of Arts by President George W. Bush at the White House.  In 2014, he starred in The Judge alongside Robert Downey Jr. While the movie itself received mixed reviews, Duvall's performance was praised. He was nominated for a Golden Globe, Screen Actors Guild, and Academy Award for his supporting role. In 2015, at age 84, Duvall became the oldest actor ever nominated for the Academy Award for Best Supporting Actor for his role in the film The Judge, a record that has since been surpassed by Christopher Plummer.

In 2018, he appeared in the Steve McQueen directed heist thriller Widows as a corrupt power broker. The film earned critical acclaim. In 2021, he was interviewed by Stephen Colbert for The Late Show with Stephen Colbert where he discussed his film career, living with Dustin Hoffman, his role in Network, and his acting techniques.

Personal life 

Duvall has been married four times but does not have any children. "I guess I’m shooting blanks," he said in 2007. He has said, "[I’ve tried] with a lot of different women, in and out of marriage." Duvall met his first wife, Barbara Benjamin, a former announcer and dancer on The Jackie Gleason Show, during the shooting of To Kill a Mockingbird. She had also appeared in Guys and Dolls (1955) and The Courtship of Eddie's Father (1963) using the name Barbara Brent. She had two daughters from her previous marriage. The couple were married from 1964 until 1975. His second wife was Gail Youngs, to whom he was married from 1982 to 1986. His marriage to Youngs temporarily made him the brother-in-law of John Savage, Robin Young, and Jim Youngs. His third marriage was to Sharon Brophy, a dancer, from 1991 to 1995.

In 2005, Duvall married his fourth wife, Luciana Pedraza, granddaughter of Argentine aviation pioneer Susana Ferrari Billinghurst. He met Pedraza in Argentina, recalling, "The flower shop was closed, so I went to the bakery. If the flower shop had been open, I never would've met her." They were both born on January 5, but Duvall is 41 years older. They have been together since 1997. He produced, directed, and acted with her in Assassination Tango, with the majority of filming in Buenos Aires. Duvall is also known as a very skilled Argentine tango dancer, having a tango studio in Argentina and in the United States.

Duvall's political views are variously described as libertarian or conservative. He was personally invited to Republican President George W. Bush's inauguration in 2001. In September 2007, he announced his support for Republican Presidential candidate Rudy Giuliani. Duvall worked the floor at the GOP's 2008 national convention. In September 2008, he appeared onstage at a John McCain–Sarah Palin rally in New Mexico, and he endorsed Republican presidential nominee Mitt Romney in 2012. However, in 2014, Duvall said in an interview he had become an independent.

In 2001, Pedraza and Duvall founded the Robert Duvall Children's Fund to assist families in Northern Argentina through renovations of homes, schools, and medical facilities. Duvall and Pedraza have been active supporters of Pro Mujer, a nonprofit charity organization dedicated to helping Latin America's poorest women (with Duvall and Pedraza concentrating on Pedraza's home in the Argentine Northwest).

Duvall is known to train Brazilian jiu-jitsu and practices martial arts with his wife.

In May 2009, Duvall spoke for historic preservation against Walmart's proposal to build a store across the road from the entrance to the Wilderness Battlefield national park in Orange County, Virginia. In 2011, he appeared at the Texas Children's Cancer Center charity event, "An Evening with a Texas Legend", in Houston, where he was interviewed by Bob Schieffer.

In February 2023, Duvall spoke at a council meeting in suburban Virginia against a proposed Amazon facility. The facility was nonetheless approved.

Filmography

Awards and nominations

References

Further reading

External links 

 
 
 

1931 births
Living people
20th-century American male actors
21st-century American male actors
American Christian Scientists
American film producers
American male film actors
American male screenwriters
American male television actors
American people of English descent
American people of French descent
Best Actor Academy Award winners
Best Drama Actor Golden Globe (film) winners
Best Miniseries or Television Movie Actor Golden Globe winners
Best Supporting Actor Golden Globe (film) winners
Best Supporting Actor BAFTA Award winners
R
Film directors from California
Film directors from Maryland
Film directors from Virginia
Film producers from California
Independent Spirit Award winners
Lee family of Virginia
Male actors from Maryland
Male actors from San Diego
Male Western (genre) film actors
Neighborhood Playhouse School of the Theatre alumni
Obie Award recipients
Outstanding Performance by a Lead Actor in a Miniseries or Movie Primetime Emmy Award winners
Outstanding Performance by a Male Actor in a Supporting Role Screen Actors Guild Award winners
People from Annapolis, Maryland
People from Severna Park, Maryland
People from The Plains, Virginia
Principia College alumni
Screenwriters from California
United States Army soldiers
United States National Medal of Arts recipients
Writers from Maryland
Writers from San Diego
Virginia Republicans